Rødgrød, rote Grütze, or rode Grütt, meaning "red groats", is a sweet fruit dish from Denmark and Northern Germany. The name of the dish in Danish features many of the elements that make Danish pronunciation difficult for non-native speakers, so , literally "red porridge with cream", has been a commonly used shibboleth since the early 1900s.

Traditional preparation

Rødgrød or rote Grütze was traditionally made of groat or grit, as revealed by the second component of the name in Danish, German, or Low German.

Semolina and sago are used in some family recipes; potato starch is today the standard choice to achieve a creamy to pudding-like starch gelatinization. The essential ingredients that justify the adjective are red summer berries such as redcurrant, blackcurrant, raspberries, strawberries, blackberries, bilberries and stoned black cherries. The essential flavour can be achieved with redcurrant alone; a small amount of blackcurrant will add variety; sugar is used to intensify the flavour. The amounts of starch, sago, semolina differ with the solidity desired; 20 to 60 grams on a kilogram or liter of the recipe are usual; sago, groat or grit have to soak before they can be used.

The preparation is basically that of a pudding: The fruits are cooked briefly with sugar. The mass should cool down for a moment so that the starch—dissolved in fruit juice or water—can be stirred into it without clumping. A second cooking process of one to two minutes is needed to start the gelatinization; remaining streaks of white starch have to clear up in this process.

Rødgrød or rote Grütze is served hot or cold as a dessert with milk, a mixture of milk and vanilla sugar, vanilla sauce, (whipped) cream, vanilla ice cream, or custard to balance the refreshing taste of the fruit acids.

Variants
There are several commercial variants of rødgrød, sold in German supermarkets. Grüne Grütze, a green variant, is made from apple, gooseberries, kiwifruit and rhubarb by a Danish producer. This unusual combination may be inspired by the more traditional Danish dish of stikkelsbærgrød (gooseberry jelly). In blaue Grütze, the blue variant, blackberries, bilberries, plums, blackcurrant, and grapes are usually used. Gelbe Grütze consists of peaches, yellow gooseberries, bananas, gold kiwifruit, or other yellow fruits.

In Poland, parts of Russia, the Baltic states, Finland, and Ukraine, kissel is known as a dessert similar to rødgrød.

In the US Virgin Islands, formerly the Danish West Indies before the US purchased the islands in 1917, it is known as red grout and is made with tapioca, guava, and sugar, served with a custard sauce. 

In Southern Brazil, sagu is a popular dessert made with tapioca pearls, sugar and red wine, mainly appreciated by Italian and German-origin families.

See also

 Danish cuisine
 Fruit kissel
 List of fruit dishes
 List of porridges
 List of shibboleths

References

External links
Use of "Rødgrød med fløde" as Danish shibboleth during World War II
YouTube video with Danes pronouncing "Rødgrød med fløde"

Danish desserts
Porridges
German desserts
North German cuisine
Schleswig-Holstein cuisine
Hamburg cuisine
Fruit dishes